Chantal Rogerat (15 December 1931 Paris - 30 April 2018 Saint-Avé) was a French feminist, sociologist, historian, trade unionist, and magazine editor.

She was editor-in-chief of Antoinette magazine from 1969 to 1982, while working at the Thomson factory in Paris.

She contributed to the emergence and promotion of feminist issues within the working world, particularly on the themes of contraception, abortion, and sexism.

Life 
She came from a family of bourgeois and Catholic origins: her father, Jacques Paul Rogerat, is an executive in the pharmaceutical industry while her mother, Jeanne Madeleine Blin, is a stay-at-home mother. She attended secondary school at the Couvent des Oiseaux, a boarding school dedicated to the education of young girls. She studied history, social psychology and sociology at the University of the Sorbonne. She graduated in the 1950s.

She was hired as a literary attaché at Calmann-Lévy where she worked for five years. She then became a teacher at the Couvent des Oiseaux, where she had been a pupil.

In the early 1960s she devoted herself to the working world and where she then remained for most of her professional career.  She is hired at the Thomson factory in Paris in the 13th arrondissement, and she stayed there for five years as a specialized worker (OS), telling herself "that life would be much more interesting if [she was going] to see factory what happens”3. Very quickly, she joined the CGT and campaigned for the qualification of blue-collar work, which led her to join the strike in 1963 which resulted in a revaluation of the status of Chantal, and her colleagues, as professional workers (OP) . This political victory reinforced her trade union values, and she joined the CGT federation of metallurgy in 1964, and was quickly appointed permanent trade unionist for metals. She considers that her field of struggle is not limited to that of women, but that it includes workers. In particular, she was responsible for traveling around France, alongside unionized comrades, to transmit political and militant orientation to members of the CGT. She explains in particular that “everyone is very happy to see a woman, it changes them from other permanent workers”.

Chantal Rogerat remains critical of the events of May 1968 despite the historical achievements of this period, in particular because of the low place given to women within the movement. At that time, women's voice was rare, their demands were absent and they were generally assigned to roles considered "feminine". When Chantal Rogerat is asked to comfort the wife of a striker killed during a CRS intervention. She blames the metals federation for not leading unity of action. She then moves away from it, and plays a relatively distant role during these two months of struggle.

In 1969, Madeleine Colin proposed to Chantal Rogerat to become the editor-in-chief of the monthly women's magazine Antoinette created by the CGT. The magazine then had low popularity with a distribution that did not exceed 10,000 copies. With Chantal Rogerat at its head, Antoinette underwent an editorial turnaround, moving away from so-called "feminine" subjects, such as cooking, fashion, and became the only women's magazine to allow the dissemination of feminist ideas within from the working and trade union world.

Over the years a distrust of Chantal Rogerat developed, she was accused in particular of being a ceditist and of prioritizing the struggle of women over the workers' struggle. In 1982, she publicly displayed her disagreement with the political line of the CGT in the face Martial law in Poland by General Jaruzelski. Chantal Rogerat considered that the union was not sufficiently critical of the imprisonment of trade union activists. Her position had serious consequences: the magazine Antoinette was put under guardianship.  Chantal Rogerat was first replaced at the head of the women's sector, and the editorial staff of the magazine, then dismissed.

Chantal Rogerat  joined the French National Centre for Scientific Research. She carried out numerous studies on the world of work at the CNRS and in particular at the GEDISST, CNRS' own research unit created in 1983, she carried out numerous studies on the world of work. She studied precarity and unemployment. She then became deputy director of this same group in the early 1990s. the first group on gender issues at the CNRS, and in 1999, she merged the review “Travail, genre et societies”, also alongside Margaret Maruani who remained until 2018.

In 2005 she retired. She moved to Brittany, where she lived until her death on 30 April 2018.

Works 
 Ephesia., France. Mission de coordination pour la 4ème conférence mondiale sur les femmes. et Impr. Sagim), La place des femmes : les enjeux de l'identité et de l'égalité au regard des sciences sociales, Paris, Ed. la Découverte, 1995, 740 p.
 Hirata, Helena Sumiko, et Senotier, Danièle, Femmes et partage du travail , Paris, Syros, 1996, 280 p.
 Maruani, Margaret., Paris, La Découverte, 2005, 480 p.
 Hirata Helena et Rogerat Chantal, 1988, Technologie, qualification et division sexuelle du travail, Revue française de sociologie, vol. 29, n° 1, p. 171-192.
 Rogerat Chantal et Senotier Danièle (eds.), 1994, Chômage en héritage, Vincennes, Grec. 1994 
 Femmes chômeuses de longue durée de faible niveau de qualification. Une action expérimentale formation/emploi 1992-1995. Analyses et propositions. Vicennes, Grec.1995,

References 

1931 births
2018 deaths
French women sociologists
Trade unionists
French women activists
French feminists
Women's rights activists